Selim Ilgaz (born 22 June 1995) is a French professional footballer who plays as a winger for TFF First League club Manisa.

Career
Ilgaz is a youth product of his local side, and joined the youth academy of Sochaux. After training with the reserves of Sochaux, Ilgaz moved to Turkey joining Hatayspor in 2016. He helped them get promoted into the Süper Lig in 2020. Ilgaz made his professional debut with Hatayspor in a 2–0 Süper Lig win over defending champions İstanbul Başakşehir on 14 September 2020, scoring a goal in his debut.

Personal life
Born in France, Ilgaz is of Turkish descent.

References

External links
 
 
 

1989 births
People from Montfermeil
Footballers from Seine-Saint-Denis
French people of Turkish descent
Living people
French footballers
Association football wingers
FC Sochaux-Montbéliard players
Fatih Karagümrük S.K. footballers
Kayseri Erciyesspor footballers
Hatayspor footballers
Manisa FK footballers
Championnat National 2 players
Süper Lig players
TFF First League players
TFF Second League players